Uthaman may refer to:

Uththaman, 1976 Tamil film
Uthaman (2001 film), 2001 Malayalam film
Harish Uthaman (born 1982), Indian film actor